Bosnian League of Kosovo is a Bosnian Minority party in Kosovo. It is in the Coalition Government and its leader is Ibrahim Ibrahimović.

Bosniak political parties
Political parties of minorities in Kosovo